Ashkal (also Romanized as Ashkāl; also known as Ashkālī) is a village in Otaqvar Rural District, Otaqvar District, Langarud County, Gilan Province, Iran. At the 2006 census, its population was 79, in 23 families.

References 

Populated places in Langarud County